Schio is a railway station in the Italian town of Schio, in the Veneto region. The station lies on the Vicenza–Schio railway and the train services are operated by Trenitalia.

Train services 
The station is served by the following service(s):

 Local services (Treno regionale) Vicenza - Thiene - Schio

Railway stations in Veneto
Province of Vicenza
Schio